Constituent Assembly elections were held in Estonia on 5–7 April 1919. The elections were called by the Estonian Provisional Government during the Estonian War of Independence. The Assembly was elected by party-list proportional representation in one nationwide district using the D'Hondt method. Eligible voters included soldiers at the front. The elections were won by left-wing and centrist parties.

Results

References

Constituent assemblies
Independence of Estonia
Parliamentary elections in Estonia
Constitutent
Estonia
Election and referendum articles with incomplete results